Crunoecia is a genus of caddisflies belonging to the family Lepidostomatidae.

The species of this genus are found in Europe.

Species:
 Crunoecia fortuna Malicky, 2002 
 Crunoecia irrorata (Curtis, 1834)

References

Integripalpia
Trichoptera genera